Mathew John Protheroe (born 10 October 1996) is a Welsh rugby union player who plays as a fly-half or fullback for Ospreys.

Born in Swansea, he was educated at Hartpury College in Gloucestershire, and was praised for his performances for Hartpury RFC in the 2014–15 season, scoring seven tries in 14 appearances in National League 1.

He made his Aviva Premiership A League debut for Gloucester against the Sale Jets in January 2015 at the age of 18.

On 27 May 2015, Protheroe signed his first professional contract with Gloucester Rugby, despite attraction from other top Premiership clubs. However, he left early by mutual agreement to join local rivals Bristol Rugby in the RFU Championship from the 2017–18 season.

On 22 February 2015, Protheroe was selected for England U18s, qualifying for England age group sides by virtue of playing for an English club, despite having no family or residential qualification for England. He produced a man-of-the-match performance in their 21–5 victory over France.

On 26 February 2020, the Ospreys announced the signing of Protheroe from Bristol for the 2020–21 season.

References

External links
 Bristol Profile

1996 births
Living people
Alumni of Hartpury College
Bristol Bears players
Gloucester Rugby players
Rugby union players from Swansea
Welsh rugby union players
Ospreys (rugby union) players
Rugby union fly-halves